DYSS (pronounced DY-double-S; 999 AM) Super Radyo is a radio station owned and operated by GMA Network. The station's studio is located at the GMA Skyview Complex, Nivel Hills, Apas, Cebu City, while its transmitter is located at Alumnos, Brgy. Mambaling, Cebu City. DYSS operates on Mondays through Saturdays from 3:30 a.m. to 11:00 p.m. and on Sundays from 4:30 a.m. to 9:00 p.m.

At present, DYSS is considered one of the top AM stations in Metro Cebu and Central Visayas.

History

DYSS began its radio operations on July 4, 1957. It was then owned by Loreto F. de Hemedes Inc. through DZBB in Manila, later the Republic Broadcasting System of Robert "Uncle Bob" Stewart. It was first located in Fortunata Bldg. at the corner of Magallanes & Lapu-lapu Sts. with a 167-ft. vertical antenna and 1-kilowatt BC Gates Transmitter situated in Mambaling Seaside. It was initially situated on 1560 kHz.

In September 1972, the station was among the stations shut down following the declaration of Martial Law by then-President Ferdinand Marcos by the virtue of Proclamation 1081. Two years later, the assets of RBS were sold to the triumvirate of Gilberto Duavit Sr., Menardo Jimenez and Felipe Gozon due to the changes in media ownership laws. At the same time, DYSS returned to the airwaves under the branding Dobol S as a music station. In November 1978, following the switch from the NARBA-mandated 10 kHz to the adoption of the 9 kHz spacing implemented by the Geneva Frequency Plan of 1975 on AM radio stations in the Philippines and across the Asia-Pacific region, DYSS moved its frequency to 999 kHz.

On July 17, 1989, the station switched to a news and public service format, now known as simply DYSS. The following year, DYSS, along with its sister stations DYSS-TV and DYRT, transferred to its current home at the GMA Skyview Complex in Nivel Hills. On January 4, 1999, the station, along with its sister AM stations, started carrying the Super Radyo branding. At the same time, DYSS started carrying GMA Cebu's Balitang Bisdak on a slightly-delayed basis at 6:00 pm followed by GMA's evening newscast 24 Oras at 6:30 pm.

In 2017, DYSS, together with other RGMA AM and FM stations nationwide, officially launched its new logo coinciding with DZBB's first ever jingle and the relaunch of Dobol B sa News TV (renamed into Dobol B TV) which returned on GMA News TV (now GTV).

Former anchors
Bobby Nalzaro (deceased)

References

Super Radyo stations
DYSS
Radio stations established in 1957